The pan-Green coalition, pan-Green force or pan-Green groups is a nationalist political coalition in Taiwan (Republic of China), consisting of the Democratic Progressive Party (DPP), Taiwan Statebuilding Party (TSP), Taiwan Solidarity Union (TSU), Social Democratic Party (SDP), Green Party Taiwan, and Taiwan Constitution Association (TCA). The platform of the New Power Party is also very closely aligned with all the other Pan-Green parties.

History 

The name comes from the colours of the Democratic Progressive Party, which originally adopted green in part because of its association with the anti-nuclear movement. In contrast to the  Pan-Blue Coalition, the Pan-Green Coalition favors Taiwanization and Taiwan independence over Chinese unification, although members in both coalitions have moderated their policies to reach voters in the center.

This strategy is helped by the fact that much of the motivation that voters have for voting for one party or the other are for reasons that have nothing to do with relations with China. This is particularly true among swing voters. For much of the 1990s, the parties which later formed the Pan-Green Coalition greatly benefited because they were less corrupt than the ruling Kuomintang (KMT). However, due to the controversies and the alleged corruption cases involving the former DPP nominated President Chen Shui-bian, the public perception of the Coalition is seemed to have been altered somewhat.

The Pan-Green Coalition formed in the aftermath of the 2000 presidential election, after which Lee Teng-hui was expelled from the Kuomintang and created his own party, the Taiwan Solidarity Union, which maintains a pro-independence platform.

The internal dynamics of the Pan-Green Coalition are different from those of the Pan-Blue coalition.  Unlike the Pan-Blue coalition, which consists of relatively equal-sized parties with very similar ideologies, the pan-green coalition contains the DPP, which is much larger and more moderate than the TSU. So rather than coordinating electoral strategies, as in the case of the parties within the Pan-Blue coalition, the presence of the TSU keeps the DPP from moving too far away from its Taiwan independence roots. In local elections, competition tends to be fierce between Pan-Green candidates from different parties, and as a rule, joint candidates are not proposed.

The Green Party Taiwan is not to be considered as part of the Pan-Green Coalition; however, the Green Party has similar views with the Democratic Progressive Party, especially on environmental and social issues, and the Green Party are also allied with Social Democratic Party.

Member parties

Current members

Former members

Legislative strength

Legislative Yuan

Media
 Liberty Times
 Apple Daily (Taiwan)
 Sanlih E-Television

See also 
 Left-wing nationalism
 Pan-Blue Coalition
 Pan-Purple Coalition
 Politics of the Republic of China
 Progressivism in Taiwan
 Taiwanese nationalism

References

External links 
 Taipei Times editorial on the colored alliances

Centre-left politics
Identity politics in Taiwan
Political organizations based in Taiwan
Progressivism in Taiwan
Taiwan independence movement
Taiwanese nationalism